The Kaitag Utsmiate was a multiethnic feudal political entity in North Caucasus. The first mentions of it start appearing in chronicles from the 5th century, and it was eliminated in 1820 during Russian conquest of the Caucasus. The state's territories were spanning over Kaitag, Dakhaday and partially Segokala, Derbent, Kayakent districts of modern Dagestan.

References 
 А. О. Муртазаев, Кайтаг в VIII - первой половине XIX в. (Исследование политической истории и роли в системе политических структур Северо-Восточного Кавказа).
 С. К. Умаханов, Историческая география Дагестана XVII — нач. XIX в.

History of Dagestan
1820 disestablishments in Asia
5th-century establishments